Pavel Macháček (born 18 December 1977) is a Czech football defender currently playing for FK Bohemians Prague (Střížkov) in the Czech Republic.

Career statistics

Statistics accurate as of 30 June 2012

References

External links
 

1977 births
Living people
Czech footballers
Czech First League players
Bohemians 1905 players
FK Bohemians Prague (Střížkov) players
Association football defenders